The Hell Hollow slender salamander (Batrachoseps diabolicus) is a species of salamander in the family Plethodontidae.  It is endemic to California, in Mariposa County in western United States.

Distribution
This salamander is endemic to the watersheds of the Merced River through to the American River, at elevations below , on the western slope of the  Sierra Nevada.

Conservation
The Hell Hollow slender salamander is an IUCN Red List Vulnerable species.

References

External links
IUCN: all species searchpage

Slender salamanders
Salamander
Salamander
Fauna of the Sierra Nevada (United States)
Yosemite National Park
Merced County, California
Taxonomy articles created by Polbot
Amphibians described in 1998